The Square des Épinettes is a green space in the Épinettes district of Paris (17th arrondissement). It was created in 1893 by Jean-Camille Formigé. Two sculptures in the garden represent famous personalities of the area : Maria Deraismes, a feminist, and Jean Leclaire, an entrepreneur.

17th arrondissement of Paris
Parks and open spaces in Paris